Joey Gosiengfiao (March 15, 1941 – March 16, 2007) was a Filipino movie director, well known for the campy box-office hits he directed.

Early life
He was born Jose Gosiengfiao on March 15, 1941, in Manila. He finished his studies at University of the East.

Career
Joey was best known for the sexy, campy box-office hits he directed for Regal Films in the 1970s and 1980s: Temptation Island, Underage, Bomba Star, Katorse, 14 Going Steady, among others. His films launched the likes of Dina Bonnevie, Maricel Soriano and Gretchen Barretto to full stardom and discovered established actors like Albert Martinez, Al Tantay, and Orestes Ojeda. In recent years, he had worked as publicist for Regal Films.

Some of his other works as a director were the Rape of Virginia P. (1989), Bomba Star (1980), and Nympha (1980).

Apart from his directorial success, Gosiengfiao is also known for his craft as a supervising producer for films like Pila Balde (1999), Pahiram Kahit Sandali (1998) and the more recent Forever My Love (2004).

Personal life
Director Joey Gosiengfiao is the uncle of singer, pianist, actress & cosplayer Alodia Gosiengfiao.

Death
He died on Friday, March 16, 2007 at 3:50 a.m., one day after suffering from his sixth heart attack on his 66th birthday Thursday, according to friends. He was rushed to Quirino Memorial Medical Center, Quezon City on Thursday due to heart attack, his 6th, but died a few hours later. He was cremated, according to Perez and Monteverde, at Loyola Memorial Park, in Marikina. A memorial service for the late director was also organized by his friends.

Filmography

Director

Producer

Supervising Producer

Executive Producer

Story

Screenplay

Writer

References

1941 births
2007 deaths
Filipino writers
Filipino film directors
Filipino film producers
People from Manila
Artists from Metro Manila
University of the East alumni
Burials at the Loyola Memorial Park